Nadungamuwa Vijaya Raja, also known as simply Nadungamuwa Raja ( – 7 March 2022), was an Indian elephant. 

For more than a decade, he was the main casket bearer of the procession of Esala, an annual procession held to pay homage to the Sacred Tooth Relic of Buddha, held in Kandy, Sri Lanka. One of the most celebrated elephants in Asia during his lifetime, Nadungamuwa Raja was one of the largest tame elephants in Asia. Following Raja's death, the then Sri Lankan President Gotabaya Rajapaksa declared Raja a national treasure, in recognition of his valuable services to the religion and culture of Sri Lanka.

History

Raja was born  1953 in Mysore, India. He was named after Nadungamuwa, the village in which he resided. 

Nadungamuwa village has been home to temple elephants since 1917, when Livnis Perera, the grandfather of Raja's final owner, Harsha Dharmavijaya, bought an elephant in order to take his younger brother in a procession to the Balummahara Godagedara Pirivena, Perera. That elephant was the first in the Nadungamuwa elephant lineage. The village of Nadungamuwa celebrated the centenary of the lineage in 2018 with Raja, who was considered to be the most important elephant in the country.

Raja was one of two elephant calves bestowed upon a veteran native physician monk who resided in the Nilammahara Temple, boralesgamuwa, 1st owner is Neelammahara purana temple desheeya manasika wedaduru - Dr, dehiwala dammaloka himi and desheeya manasika wedaduru - Dr,dehiwala buddha rakkitha himi.(sri lanka no ruls and no register sisterm for elephnts,1950 to 1970) .2 nd Owner is horana/Bandaragama mr, Herbert wickramasinghe mantree.now last owner is                  = Dr. Harsha Dharmavijaya. Jayachamarajendra Wadiyar, the Maharaja of Mysore, in appreciation for curing his relative's lengthy illness. In 1978, when Raja was 25 years old, he was acquired from his second owner, Herbert Wickramasinghe, a former parliamentarian from Bandaragama, for Rs. 75,000. His new owner was Dharmavijaya Veda Ralahamy, an eminent Ayurvedic physician. After the death of Ralahamy, the elephant was looked after by his son, Harsha Dharmavijaya, also an Ayurvedic doctor. 

Raja was attended by four mahouts over his lifetime: Seaman, Soma, Simon, and finally Wilson Kodithuwakku, known locally as "Kalu Mama", who cared for Raja for more than 15 years. Indika Jayasinghe from Polgahawela worked as the helper of Kalu Mama.

Perahera procession 
Before participating in the Kandy Esala Perahera, Raja continually participated in many perahera festivals in Gampaha and Colombo and joined the procession of the Sabaragamuwa Maha Saman Devalaya in 1985. In 2005, at age 52, Raja joined the Kandy Esala Perahera by request of Pradeep Nilanga Dela, who is the Diyawadana Nilame of Sri Dalada Maligawa. Raja went on to participate in the Kandy Esala Perahera for more than a decade.

On all these occasions the elephant travelled to Kandy on foot, covering a distance of about 90 km from Weliweriya, Gampaha to Kandy. Due to a road accident in 2016, the government provided military protection to the elephant when it arrived in Kandy. Raja always left the Nedungamuwa Palace after the monks' and employers' worship by sprinkling Pirith and tying Pirith strings. The relics casket was carried 13 times by the tusker during the Dalada Perahera, the last time being in 2021.

Death
Nadungamuwa Raja died in the early morning of 7 March 2022 at the age of 68/69, following a brief illness. Raja was posthumously honoured as a national treasure and given full state honours. The President of Sri Lanka Gotabaya Rajapaksa directed that Raja's body be preserved as a stuffed body.

Legacy
A postage stamp of Rs. 15 and a first day cover were issued on 30 December 2019 in appreciation of the elephant's religious and cultural mission. After the chanting of the Pirith by the Chief Incumbent of the Siamese Mahanayake Thera, Ven., the first day cover was released. The 2354 First Day Cover Issue was the second occasion for the release of an elephant stamp and first day cover.

See also
Heiyantuduwa Raja (elephant)
List of individual elephants
Millangoda Raja
Raja (elephant)

References

Further reading 

 
 
 

1953 animal births
2022 animal deaths
Individual elephants
Individual animals in Sri Lanka
Elephants in Sri Lanka